James William Kennedy (8 July 1919 – 3 March 2001) was an Australian politician. He was a Country Party member of the New South Wales Legislative Council from 1971 to 1984.

Kennedy was born in Murrumbeena, Melbourne. He served in the RAAF from 1940 to 1946 and joined the Country Party on his return in 1947. He worked as a farmer and company director. In 1956 he was elected to Taree Municipal Council. He served on several local councils until 1971, and was Mayor of Taree from 1965 to 1971.

In 1971, Kennedy was elected to the New South Wales Legislative Council as a Country Party member. He served until 1984. Kennedy died in 2001 in Taree.

References

1919 births
2001 deaths
National Party of Australia members of the Parliament of New South Wales
Members of the New South Wales Legislative Council
20th-century Australian politicians
Royal Australian Air Force personnel of World War II
Military personnel from Melbourne
People from Murrumbeena, Victoria
Politicians from Melbourne
20th-century Australian businesspeople
Australian farmers
Businesspeople from Melbourne
Mayors of places in New South Wales
New South Wales local councillors